Grand Theft Bus is a Canadian band based in Fredericton, New Brunswick, Canada.  Known for short, catchy, genre jumping ditties and long meandering nonsensical improvisations with occasional magic and a touch of musical comedy.

History
Formed in 2000, the band consists of Tim Walker (guitar, vocals), Graeme Walker (bass, vocals), Dennis Goodwin (guitar, synths, vocals) and Bob Deveau (drums and electronics). Their first album, Birth of Confusion, was released in 2003.

Grand Theft Bus are a sonically dynamic group with an eclectic blend of songs ranging from pop to prog, heavy and intense to light and fluffy, quirky nonsense to meaningful melodrama.

The band regularly plays Nova Scotia's Evolve Festival, as well as the Harvest Jazz and Blues Festival.

A mockumentary about the band, Rubarbicon, was filmed by independent filmmaker Greg Hemmings and released in 2006.

The band recorded its 2008 album, Made Upwards, in the main dining room of New Brunswick's lieutenant-governor's mansion.

The band has received the Newcap Radio Alternative Recording of the Year for their album Made Upwards

Synth player Brad Perry joined the band in 2010. Their album Distracted Tracks appeared on the !earshot National Top 50 Chart in December 2015.

Discography
 Birth of Confusion (2003)
 Flies in the No Fly (2005)
 Made Upwards (2008)
 Say It With Me (2012)
 Distracted Tracks (EP - 2015)
 Are We Still Playing? (2019)

See also

Music of Canada
Music of New Brunswick
Canadian rock
List of Canadian musicians
List of bands from Canada
:Category:Canadian musical groups

References

External links
Grand Theft Bus official website (defunct)
Grand Theft Bus bandcamp

Musical groups established in 2000
Canadian indie rock groups
Musical groups from Fredericton
2000 establishments in New Brunswick